In the United States, a federal resume is a type of résumé constructed specifically to apply for Federal government jobs. Like a private sector resume, it contains a summary or listing of relevant job experience and education. A Federal resume is one of three documents accepted as an official application for position vacancies within the Federal government. The other two are the OF-612 and the traditional SF-171. The SF–171 is considered obsolete and is no longer accepted by most government agencies.

A standard private-sector resume should not be used to apply for Federal positions. Not only is the format different in terms of structure, length and content, but a Federal resume must include all the information required by a job announcement.  Applications not following these guidelines will not be considered. Federal resumes are written in chronological resume format. Specific information is required to be included on federal resumes so that applicants can be rated uniformly. This additional information is not typically requested on private sector resumes, and resumes that do not include it will likely be rejected. This information includes:

Job Information (Announcement number, title, series and grade of job for which applying) 
Personal Information (Full name, mailing address w/ zip code, day and evening phone numbers w/ area code, social security #, country of citizenship, veteran's preference, reinstatement eligibility, highest Federal civilian grade held) 
Education (High school: name, city, and state, date of diploma or GED, Colleges or universities: name, city and state, majors, type and year of any degrees received) 
Work Experience (Job title, duties and accomplishments, employer's name and address, supervisor's name and phone number, starting and ending dates, hours per week, salary, statement either giving or withholding permission to contact current supervisor) 
Other Qualifications (Job-related training courses, skills, certificates and licenses, honors, awards and special accomplishments; for example, publications, memberships in professional or honor societies, leadership activities, public speaking and performance awards)

Federal resumes usually cover the last ten years of employment history and are often three to five pages long when printed. Federal resumes sometimes require KSA as a separate document, but this information is often included within the resume itself. The commonly accepted Outline Format resume, developed by Kathryn Troutman in the 1990s, uses short paragraphs to describe duties and bulleted lists of accomplishments to illustrate KSAs.

The USAJobs website offers an online resume builder. Job counselors for the federal government recommend use of the builder to create online USAJobs resumes for two reasons:  the builder will helps ensure that all required content is included, and the builder makes the resume "searchable" by HR specialists.  The site will allows uploading of up to 5 resumes, in addition to other necessary documents listed in the job announcement (such as a DD Form 214 for veterans, or non-official copies of college/university transcripts).

Many USAJOBS announcements are time-sensitive, and the process of creating a federal resume for the first time and gaining access to the various elements of the USAJOBS application system and any companion systems can take upwards of 2 hours.

References

External links 

 USAJobs.gov - Federal Resume Writing Tips   
 Sample Federal Resume 
 Federal Government Worker Resume
 Difference Between Cash vs. Mortgage

 Civil service in the United States